Foam cells, also called lipid-laden macrophages, are a type of cell that contain cholesterol. These can form a plaque that can lead to atherosclerosis and trigger heart attacks and stroke.

Foam cells are fat-laden cells with a M2 macrophage-like phenotype. They contain low density lipoproteins (LDL) and can only be truly detected by examining a fatty plaque under a microscope after it is removed from the body. They are named because the lipoproteins give the cell a foamy appearance.

Despite the connection with cardiovascular diseases they might not be inherently dangerous.

Some foam cells are derived from smooth muscle cells and present a limited macrophage-like phenotype.

Formation

Foam cell formation is triggered by a number of factors including the uncontrolled uptake of modified low density lipoproteins (LDL), the upregulation of cholesterol esterification and the impairment of mechanisms associated with cholesterol release. Foam cells are formed when circulating monocyte-derived cells are recruited to the atherosclerotic lesion site or fat deposits in the blood vessel walls. Recruitment is facilitated by the molecules P-selectin and E-selectin, intercellular adhesion molecule 1 (ICAM-1) and vascular cell adhesion molecule 1 (VCAM-1).  

Monocytes are then able to penetrate the arterial wall as a result of impaired endothelial integrity which increases permeability. Once in the sub endothelium space, inflammation processes induce the differentiation of monocytes into mature macrophages. Macrophages are then able to internalize modified lipoproteins like βVLDL (beta very low density lipoprotein), AcLDL (acetylated low density lipoprotein) and OxLDL (oxidized low density lipoprotein) through their binding to the scavenger receptors (SRs) such as CD36 and SR-A on the macrophage surface. These scavenger receptors act as "Pattern recognition receptors" (PRR's) on macrophages and are responsible for recognizing and binding to oxLDL, which in turn promotes the formation of foam cells through internalization of these lipoproteins. 

Coated-pit endocytosis, phagocytosis and pinocytosis are also responsible for lipoprotein internalization.
Once internalized, scavenged lipoproteins are transported to endosomes or lysosomes for degradation, whereby the cholesteryl esters (CE) are hydrolyzed to unesterified free cholesterol (FC) by lysosomal acid lipase (LPL). Free cholesterol is transported to the endoplasmic reticulum where it is re-esterified by ACAT1 (acyl-CoA: cholesterol acyltransferase 1) and subsequently stored as cytoplasmic liquid droplets. These droplets are responsible for the foamy appearance of the macrophage and thus the name of foam cells. At this point, foam cells can either be degraded though the de-esterification and secretion of cholesterol, or can further promote foam cell development and plaque formation – a process that is dependent on the balance of free cholesterol and esterified cholesterol.

Composition

Low-density lipoprotein (LDL) cholesterol (LDL-C — also known as “bad” cholesterol) and particularly modified forms of LDL cholesterol such as oxidized, glycated, or acetylated LDL, is contained by a foam cell - a marker of atherosclerosis. The uptake of LDL-C alone does not cause foam cell formation; however, the co-internalization of LDL-C with modified LDL in macrophages can result in foam cell development. Modified LDL affects the intracellular trafficking and metabolism of native LDL, such that not all LDL need to be modified for foam cell formation when LDL levels are high.

The maintenance of foam cells and the subsequent progression of plaque build-up is caused by the secretion of chemokines and cytokines from macrophages and foam cells. Foam cells secrete pro-inflammatory cytokines such as interleukins: IL-1, IL-6; tumour necrosis factor (TNF); chemokines: chemokines ligand 2, CCL5, CXC-chemokine ligand 1 (CXCL1); as well as macrophage retention factors. Macrophages within the atherosclerotic legion area have a decreased ability to migrate, which further promotes plaque formation as they are able to secrete cytokines, chemokines, reactive oxygen species (ROS) and growth factors that stimulate modified lipoprotein uptake and vascular smooth muscle cell (VSMC) proliferation. VSMC can also accumulate cholesteryl esters.

In chronic hyperlipidemia, lipoproteins aggregate within the intima of blood vessels and become oxidized by the action of oxygen free radicals generated either by macrophages or endothelial cells. The macrophages engulf oxidized low-density lipoproteins (LDLs) by endocytosis via scavenger receptors, which are distinct from LDL receptors. The oxidized LDL accumulates in the macrophages and other phagocytes, which are then known as foam cells. Foam cells form the fatty streaks of the plaques of atheroma in the tunica intima of arteries.

Foam cells are not dangerous as such, but can become a problem when they accumulate at particular foci thus creating a necrotic centre of atherosclerosis. If the fibrous cap that prevents the necrotic centre from spilling into the lumen of a vessel ruptures, a thrombus can form which can lead to emboli occluding smaller vessels. The occlusion of small vessels results in ischemia, and contributes to stroke and myocardial infarction, two of the leading causes of cardiovascular-related death.

Foam cells are very small in size and can only be truly detected by examining a fatty plaque under a microscope after it is removed from the body, or more specifically from the heart. Detection usually involves the staining of sections of aortic sinus or artery with Oil Red O (ORO) followed by computer imaging and analysis; or from Nile Red Staining. In addition, fluorescent microscopy or flow cytometry can be used to detect OxLDL uptake when OxLDL has been labeled with 1,1′-dioctadecyl-3,3,3′3′-tetra-methylindocyanide percholorate (DiI-OxLDL).

Autoimmunity occurs when the body starts attacking itself. The link between atherosclerosis and autoimmunity is plasmacytoid dendritic cells (pDCs). PDCs contribute to the early stages of the formation of atherosclerotic lesions in the blood vessels by releasing large quantities of type 1 interferons (INF). Stimulation of pDCs leads to an increase of macrophages present in plaques. However, during later stages of lesion progression, pDCs have been shown to have a protective effect by activating T cells and Treg function; leading to disease suppression.

Degradation

Foam cell degradation or more specifically the breakdown of esterified cholesterols, is facilitated by a number of efflux receptors and pathways. Esterified cholesterol from cytoplasmic liquid droplets are once again hydrolyzed to free cholesterol by acid cholesterol esterase. Free cholesterol can then be secreted from the macrophage by the efflux to ApoA1 and ApoE discs via the ABCA1 receptor. This pathway is usually used by modified or pathological lipoproteins like AcLDL, OxLDL and βVLDL. FC can also be transported to a recycling compartment through the efflux to ApoA1 containing HDLs (high density lipoproteins) via aqueous diffusion or transport through the SR-B1 or ABCG1 receptors. While this pathway can also be used by modified lipoproteins, LDL derived cholesterol can only use this pathway to excrete FC. The differences in excretory pathways between types of lipoproteins is mainly a result of the cholesterol being segregated into different areas.

Infectious diseases
Foamy macrophages are also found in diseases caused by pathogens that persist in the body, such as Chlamydia, Toxoplasma, or Mycobacterium tuberculosis. In tuberculosis (TB), bacterial lipids disable macrophages from pumping out excess LDL, causing them to turn into foam cells around the TB granulomas in the lung. The cholesterol forms a rich food source for the bacteria. As the macrophages die, the mass of cholesterol in the center of the granuloma becomes a cheesy substance called caseum.

Other conditions
Foam cells may form around leaked silicone from breast implants. Lipid-laden alveolar macrophages, also known as pulmonary foam cells, are seen in bronchoalveolar lavage specimens in some respiratory diseases.

References

Macrophages